Deoxyguanosine monophosphate (dGMP), also known as deoxyguanylic acid or deoxyguanylate in its conjugate acid and conjugate base forms, respectively, is a derivative of the common nucleic acid guanosine triphosphate (GTP), in which the –OH (hydroxyl) group on the 2' carbon on the nucleotide's pentose has been reduced to just a hydrogen atom (hence the "deoxy-" part of the name).  It is used as a monomer in DNA.

See also
Cofactor
Guanosine
Nucleic acid

References 

Nucleotides